Jean-Joseph Charlier (15 April 179430 March 1886) was a Belgian artisan and revolutionary who became an iconic figure in the Belgian Revolution. His participation as an amputee  in the fighting near Brussels Park during the Dutch attack on Brussels in September 1830 was widely praised, and he gained the nickname Wooden Leg.

Biography
Charlier was born in Liège on 15 April 1794. He worked as a weaver before enlisting in the French Grande Armée and served as an artilleryman. He is believed to have been wounded at the Battle of Waterloo in 1815 and had one of his legs was amputated. He subsequently lived with a wooden pegleg.

After the outbreak of the Belgian Revolution on 25 August 1830, Charlier was among the 250 volunteers from Liège who left on 3 September to defend Brussels against an attack by a Dutch Army under Prince Frederick. He participated in fighting during the so-called September Days (Journées de séptembre) from 23–26 September 1830 near the Brussels Park at the Montagne de la cour where he commanded the two cannons available to the revolutionaries.

His role in the fighting was widely commemorated by subsequent writers and he became emblematic of the revolutionaries who had participated in the September Days after Belgian independence in 1831. He died at Liège on 31 March 1866.

References

External link

1794 births
1866 deaths
People of the Belgian Revolution
People from Liège
Belgian amputees
French military personnel of the Napoleonic Wars
People of the Prince-Bishopric of Liège